Herb Siler (b. January 5, 1935 Brundidge, Alabama, United States - d. March 25, 2001 Miami) was a heavyweight boxer. He won 16 fights (including seven by knockout) and lost 12, with no draws. His career started in 1960 and ended in 1967. Siler lost to Muhammad Ali through a 4th-round knockout in 1960. In 1972 he was convicted for manslaughter and subsequently served a 7-year sentence. His grandson is NFL linebacker Brandon Siler.

Professional boxing record

|-
|align="center" colspan=8|16 Wins (7 knockouts, 9 decisions), 12 Losses (8 knockouts, 4 decisions)
|-
| align="center" style="border-style: none none solid solid; background: #e3e3e3"|Result
| align="center" style="border-style: none none solid solid; background: #e3e3e3"|Record
| align="center" style="border-style: none none solid solid; background: #e3e3e3"|Opponent
| align="center" style="border-style: none none solid solid; background: #e3e3e3"|Type
| align="center" style="border-style: none none solid solid; background: #e3e3e3"|Round
| align="center" style="border-style: none none solid solid; background: #e3e3e3"|Date
| align="center" style="border-style: none none solid solid; background: #e3e3e3"|Location
| align="center" style="border-style: none none solid solid; background: #e3e3e3"|Notes
|-align=center
|Loss
|16–12
|align=left| Moses Harrell
|UD
|6
|May 3, 1967
|align=left| Dade County Armory, Miami, Florida
|align=left|
|-
|Loss
|16–11
|align=left| Jefferson Davis
|TKO
|3
|May 3, 1966
|align=left| Houston, Texas
|align=left|
|-
|Loss
|16–10
|align=left| Franco De Piccoli
|KO
|2
|January 23, 1965
|align=left| Palasport di San Siro, Milan, Lombardy
|align=left|
|-
|Loss
|16–9
|align=left| Roberto Davila
|KO
|4
|September 11, 1963
|align=left| Estadio Nacional, Lima
|align=left|
|-
|Loss
|16–8
|align=left| Willi Besmanoff
|TKO
|4
|July 5, 1963
|align=left| Jacksonville Beach, Florida
|align=left|
|-
|Loss
|16–7
|align=left| Ernie Terrell
|TKO
|3
|March 7, 1963
|align=left| Little River Auditorium, Miami, Florida
|align=left|
|-
|Win
|16–6
|align=left| Jim Tillman
|PTS
|8
|February 25, 1963
|align=left| Jacksonville, Florida
|align=left|
|-
|Win
|15–6
|align=left|Johnny Thomas
|KO
|2
|February 21, 1963
|align=left| Little River Auditorium, Miami, Florida
|align=left|
|-
|Win
|14–6
|align=left| Willie Gulatt
|PTS
|6
|November 15, 1962
|align=left| Miami Beach Auditorium, Miami Beach, Florida
|align=left|
|-
|Loss
|13–6
|align=left| Ollie Wilson
|TKO
|4
|August 9, 1962
|align=left| Little River Auditorium, Miami, Florida
|align=left|
|-
|Loss
|13–5
|align=left| Willie Gulatt
|SD
|8
|June 14, 1962
|align=left| Little River Auditorium, Miami, Florida

|align=left|
|-
|Win
|13–4
|align=left| Nick Scott
|KO
|2
|April 19, 1962
|align=left| Little River Auditorium, Miami, Florida
|align=left|
|-
|Loss
|12–4
|align=left| Ernie Terrell
|PTS
|10
|February 28, 1962
|align=left| Miami Beach Auditorium, Miami Beach, Florida
|align=left|
|-
|Win
|12–3
|align=left| Jimmy Robinson
|TKO
|5
|February 8, 1962
|align=left| Little River Auditorium, Miami, Florida
|align=left|
|-
|Win
|11–3
|align=left| Johnny "Gorilla" Gould
|UD
|8
|January 18, 1962
|align=left| Little River Auditorium, Miami, Florida
|align=left|
|-
|Win
|10–3
|align=left| Carlos Dunston
|TKO
|3
|December 30, 1961
|align=left| Little River, Florida
|align=left|
|-
|Win
|9–3
|align=left| Willie Gulatt
|TKO
|6
|October 16, 1961
|align=left| Sir John Club, Miami, Florida
|align=left|
|-
|Win
|8–3
|align=left| Jim Tillman
|PTS
|6
|October 10, 1961
|align=left| Cutler Ridge, Miami, Florida
|align=left|
|-
|Win
|7–3
|align=left| Aaron Beasley
|TKO
|1
|September 21, 1961
|align=left| Little River Auditorium, Miami, Florida
|align=left|
|-
|Win
|6–3
|align=left| Willie "The Invader" Johnson
|UD
|6
|September 14, 1961
|align=left| Little River Auditorium, Miami, Florida
|align=left|
|-
|Win
|5–3
|align=left| Wendell Newton
|PTS
|6
|June 14, 1961
|align=left| Miami Beach Auditorium, Miami Beach, Florida
|align=left|
|-
|Win
|4–3
|align=left| Roosevelt Luggins
|TKO
|5
|May 29, 1961
|align=left| Sir John Club, Miami, Florida
|align=left|
|-
|Win
|3–3
|align=left| Wendell Newton
|PTS
|6
|May 15, 1961
|align=left| Sir John Club, Miami, Florida
|align=left|
|-
|Win
|2–3
|align=left| Tommy Stru
|PTS
|6
|April 1, 1961
|align=left| Miami Beach Auditorium, Miami Beach, Florida
|align=left|
|-
|Loss
|1–3
|align=left| Tony Hughes
|PTS
|4
|March 13, 1961
|align=left| Miami Beach Auditorium, Miami Beach, Florida
|align=left|
|-
|Loss
|1–2
|align=left| Cassius Clay
|TKO
|4
|December 27, 1960
|align=left| Miami Beach Auditorium, Miami Beach, Florida
|align=left|
|-
|Win
|1–1
|align=left| Tommy Stru
|SD
|6
|October 26, 1960
|align=left| Miami Beach Auditorium, Miami Beach, Florida
|align=left|
|-
|Loss
|0–1
|align=left| Tony Alongi
|TKO
|4
|June 7, 1960
|align=left| Miami Beach Auditorium, Miami Beach, Florida
|align=left|

References

1935 births
2001 deaths
People from Brundidge, Alabama
Boxers from Alabama
American male boxers
Heavyweight boxers